Éclair Athlétique Club des Gonaïves (commonly known as Éclair des Gonaïves, Éclair AC or simply Éclair) is a professional football club based in Gonaïves, Haiti.

References

Football clubs in Haiti
Association football clubs established in 1951
1951 establishments in Haiti
Artibonite (department)